50 Camelopardalis is a double star in the northern constellation of Lynx.  This object is visible to the naked eye as a faint white star with an apparent visual magnitude of 5.4. It is 430 light years away and moving further from the Earth with a heliocentric radial velocity of 20 km/s.

50 Camelopardalis has a spectral classification of A0 or B9 and a luminosity class of V or III. The stellar spectrum is noted to have unusually nebulous absorption lines due to its rapid rotation. At an age of 300 million years, the star is modelled to be in the late stages of the main sequence.

Due to its closeness to the much brighter star, little is known about the companion. The Tycho double star catalogue gives a proper motion similar to the bright primary star.

References 

A-type giants
B-type main-sequence stars
Lynx (constellation)
BD+50 1460
Camelopardalis, 50
061931
037701
2969
Double stars